Victoria Zukah better known as Vicky Zukah is a Ghanaian female actress and celebrity who hails from the Volta Region of Ghana.

Early life 
She is the third daughter of Mr. Komla Zugah and Miss Beatrice Patu from the Volta Region.

Career 
Her acting career started when her friends told her she has the ability to act and that she has all features that qualifies her to become an actress, so she had an opportunity to feature in her first movie which she starred alongside Jackie Appiah and the late Suzzy Williams.Her first movie Trokosi became her breakthrough movie and she believe that she was lucky. She loves to learn from her peers and experienced actors in the industry in other to improve upon her skills to act good movies.

Filmography 
List of movies she has acted over the years.

 Trokosi
 Total Exchange
 Cross My Heart
 My Darling Princess
 June 4
 Araba Lawson
 Big Girl Club
 Girls Connection
 True Colour
 Pretty Queen
 Tears of Womanhood
 The Return of Beyonce
 The  Bible
King without culture
Inner woman
Oyaw No
Agatha
Act of Shame
Mummy's daughter

References 

Living people
21st-century Ghanaian actresses
Ghanaian film actresses
Year of birth missing (living people)